The Acropolis Museum (Mouseio Akropolis) is an archaeological museum focused on the findings of the archaeological site of the Acropolis of Athens. The museum was built to house every artifact found on the rock and on the surrounding slopes, from the Greek Bronze Age to Roman and Byzantine Greece and will in particular also house the sculptures historically known as the "Elgin Marbles" (sculptures from the Acropolis bought in the early nineteenth century by Thomas Bruce, 7th Earl of Elgin and currently held in the British Museum) if these are returned to Athens. The Acropolis Museum also lies over the ruins of part of Roman and early Byzantine Athens. 

The museum was founded in 2003 while the Organization of the Museum was established in 2008. It opened to the public on 20 June 2009. More than 4,250 objects are exhibited over an area of 14,000 square metres.

History
The first museum was on the Acropolis; it was completed in 1874 and underwent a moderate expansion in the 1950s. However, successive excavations on the Acropolis uncovered many new artifacts which significantly exceeded its original capacity.

An additional motivation for the construction of a new museum was that in the past, when Greece made requests for the return of the Parthenon Marbles from the United Kingdom, which acquired the items in a controversial manner, it was suggested by some British officials that Greece had no suitable location where they could be displayed. Creation of a gallery for the display of the Parthenon Marbles has been key to all recent proposals for the design of a new museum.

Competitions for the new museum

The first architectural competition to design a new museum was held in 1976 and was limited to participants from Greece. Both the 1976 competition and one that followed it in 1979 failed to produce any results mainly because the plots of land selected for the proposed constructions were deemed unsuitable.

In 1989, a third competition for the design of the new Acropolis Museum was announced that would be international. A choice of three possible sites was provided. This competition was won by the Italian architects, Manfredi Nicoletti and Lucio Passarelli. After delays throughout the 1990s, work on the construction of the museum based on this third design progressed to the stage of excavations for the foundations, but these were stopped due to apparently sensitive archaeological remains on the site, leading to annulment of the competition in 1999.  In retrospect, the location of the new museum was rather straightforward: the large lot of the unused "Camp Makrygianni" gendarmerie barracks, opposite the Theater of Dionysus.  The barracks were built on public land and a limited number of expropriations of surrounding private houses were needed to free up the necessary space.  The main building of the old barracks, the neoclassical "Weiler Building", has been renovated and houses the Museum of the Center for the Acropolis Studies.

The fourth competition had made no provision for the preservation of the ancient site. These were met to a degree only after local and international (ICOMOS) campaigners exposed this oversight and it became the final competition. The new plans were adjusted so that the building was elevated above ground, on pillars. Competition was open only to architectural practices by invitation and it was won by New York–based architect, Bernard Tschumi, in collaboration with the Greek architect Michael Photiadis.  Excavation has revealed two layers of modest, private roadside houses and workshops, one from the early Byzantine era and another from the classical era.  Once the layout and stratigraphy of the findings were established, suitable locations for the foundation pillars were identified.  These traverse the soil to the underlying bedrock and float on roller bearings able to withstand a Richter scale magnitude 10 earthquake.

As construction work neared completion, the operation to move the historic artifacts the  distance from the Acropolis rock to the new museum started in October 2007, took four months, and required the use of three tower cranes to move the sculptures across the distance without mishap. Greek officials expressed their hope that the new museum will help in the campaign for the return of the Parthenon Marbles.

Location

The museum is located by the southeastern slope of the Acropolis hill, on the ancient road that led up to the "sacred rock" in classical times. Set only , away from the Parthenon, and a  walking distance from it, the museum is the largest modern building erected so close to the ancient site, although many other buildings from the last 150 years are located closer to the Acropolis. The entrance to the building is on Dionysiou Areopagitou Street and directly adjacent to the Akropoli metro station the red line of the Athens Metro.

The building
The design by Bernard Tschumi was selected as the winning project in the fourth competition. Tschumi's design revolved around three concepts: light, movement, and a tectonic and programmatic element.

The collections of the museum are exhibited on three levels while a fourth middle-level houses the auxiliary spaces such as the museum shop, the café, and the offices. On the first level of the museum, there are the findings of the slopes of the Acropolis. The long and rectangular hall has a sloping floor, resembling the ascension to the rock. Following the hall is a large trapezoidal hall that contains the archaic findings. On the same floor, there are artifacts and sculptures from the other Acropolis buildings such as the Erechtheum, the Temple of Athena Nike, and the Propylaea and findings from Roman and early Christian Athens. Visitors are intended to see the latter during descent in order to keep the chronological order: they will first be directed to the top level, which displays the Parthenon marbles.

The top level of the Museum sits askew on the lower levels to achieve the same cardinal orientation of the ancient temple on the Acropolis.  The spacing of the columns of the Parthenon hall is the same as that of the ancient temple and the use of glass walls on all four exterior walls allows the natural light to illumine the Parthenon marbles as they do on the ancient temple.  The 48 columns in the Parthenon hall mark the outline of the ancient temple and form a colonnade for the display of the Parthenon marbles. For ease of viewing, the pediment marbles are displayed at eye level in front of the end columns; the metopes are displayed on the columns, two per column, but not as high as in the ancient temple; and the frieze are displayed behind the metopes, forming a continuous band around the walls of a rectangular space set inside the columns, as in the ancient temple but not as high, again for ease of viewing.  From the north side of the Parthenon hall, one can see the ancient temple above on the Acropolis.

As the museum is built over an extensive archaeological site, some parts of the floor uses glass to allow visitors to see the excavations below. The museum also has an amphitheatre, virtual theatre, and hall for temporary exhibitions.

Controversy

A controversy erupted over the plans of the new museum and whether it was appropriate to build it on the archaeological site in Makrygianni neighborhood. Another concern was whether a large modern building would fit well into the landscape.

In 2007, another controversy erupted over the proposed demolition of two historic buildings. Thes are in front of the museum, numbers 17 and 19, Dionysiou Areopagitou Street, facing the Acropolis.  Bernard Tschumi has been showing photographic images of the space in front of the museum edited to remove the two buildings and nearby four-story-tall trees. The Greek Government  had the two buildings de-listed historically although one is Neo-Classical and the other an example of Art Deco architecture. Protests against the proposed demolition came from international agencies such as INTBAU and ICOMOS.

Awards
 On 13 May 2010, it was awarded the International Association of Lighting Designers (IALD) Award of Excellence and Sustainability.
 On 8 November 2010, the Museum won the British Guild of Travel Writers' (BGTW) award in Globe category for the Best Worldwide Tourism Project for 2010.
 The Museum received 2011 AIA (The American Institute of Architects) Institute Honor Award for Architecture.
 It was among the six finalists competing for the 2011 European Union Prize for Contemporary Architecture – the Mies van der Rohe Award.
 In 2012, the Museum was given the Keck Award for its conservation and restoration of the Caryatids by the International Institute for Conservation (IIC) in Vienna.
 Acropolis museum ranked 6th in the TripAdvisor's Travellers Choice Awards of the 25 Best Museums in the world for 2018.

Other information
 The entrance fee to the museum was €1 for the first year and €5 thereafter. As of 2019, the entrance fee is €10.
 The excavation below ground level continues. The site and process are visible through the ground level glass flooring. Of June 2019, the site is available for visitation.
 The Acropolis Museum was selected as the motif for a commemorative Euro coin edition: the €10 Greek Acropolis Museum commemorative coin, minted in 2008 to mark the relocation of the museum. On the obverse is a panoramic view of the Acropolis and the new museum lies at the base.
 During the August full moon nights, the museum remains open until midnight and welcomes visitors for free. Night concerts also take place on the museum's courtyard.
 In the first two months since the museum opened, it was visited by 523,540 people (an average of 9,200 a day).  Of these, 60 percent were foreign visitors. During the same two-month period, 409,000 hits by unique visitors from 180 countries were recorded by the museum's website.
 Museum of Applied Arts/Contemporary Art in Vienna lent (October 2014 – February 2015) to the Acropolis Museum a quadriga with the goddess Nike from the collection of Theophil Hansen, an architect of neoclassical buildings in Greece and central Europe in the 19th century.
 The University of Sydney's Nicholson Museum lent (December 2014 – December 2015) to the Acropolis Museum a model of the Acropolis done in Lego. The model contains more than 120,000 Lego bricks and took about 300 hours to build by Ryan McNaught.
 The Silver Cup designed by Michel Bréal and awarded to the Marathon Winner Spyros Louis at the first Modern Olympic Games (1896) is displayed at the Acropolis Museum. The Cup remained in the Acropolis Museum until the completion of the Stavros Niarchos Foundation Cultural Center where it is now exhibited.
 Hermitage Museum lent (March 2016 – October 2016) to the Acropolis Museum three golden Scythian exhibitions. The three objects were two vessels and a piece of jewelry. These masterpieces of metalworking were crafted by the Greeks at Crimea that had developed a close relationship with the Scythians.
 In June 2016, Samsung inaugurated a digital classroom at the Acropolis Museum. The digital classroom addressed to students of primary and secondary schools. This digital classroom was the first "classroom" which was set up in a Museum in Greece and the fifth in Europe.
 The US President Barack Obama visited the Acropolis museum during his visit at Athens (15–16 November 2016).
 On 24 March – 31 October 2017, Documenta 14, the fourteenth edition of the art exhibition documenta took place at the Acropolis Museum.
On 21 June 2019, Greece's Acropolis Museum opened an excavation site underneath its modern building, allowing visitors for the first time to walk through an ancient Athenian neighbourhood that survived from the Classical era to Byzantine times.

Gallery

See also
Elgin Marbles
Old Acropolis Museum, now closed and scheduled to house workshops for the ongoing Acropolis Restoration Project

References

Bibliography

External links
Official site
The Parthenon frieze.
Color the Peplos Kore.
Athena, Goddess of the Acropolis.
Acropolis Museum – Ebook by Latsis Foundation
The New Acropolis by C. Sandis
Acropolis Museum page by Google Arts & Culture

Videos
 New Acropolis Museum Receives 2011 AIA Institute Honor Award for Architecture
 New Acropolis Museum, Athens – Opening Ceremony Video Projections

 
2008 establishments in Greece
21st-century architecture in Greece
Museum, new
Ancient Greek culture
Archaeological museums in Athens
Greek culture
Landmarks in Athens
Modernist architecture in Greece
Museums established in 2008
Museums in Athens
Museums of ancient Greece in Greece